The Tournament is a major 1812 painting by Pierre Révoil, who presented it to the Museum of Fine Arts of Lyon (which still owns it) sometime before 1815. It shows the final moments of a legend of Bertrand Du Guesclin, when he reveals his identity after competing anonymously in a tournament and beating all comers.

Sources
Robert Rosenblum et H.W. Janson, 19th-century art, Pearson, 2005 (1984), p. 71.

Middle Ages in popular culture
Paintings in the collection of the Museum of Fine Arts of Lyon
History paintings
1812 paintings
French paintings
Horses in art